Lupitus of Barcelona, identified with a Christian archdeacon called Sunifred, was an astronomer in  late 10th century Barcelona, then part of the Marca Hispanica between Islamic Al-Andalus and Christian France (in 985 changing from Christian back into Muslim hands by the conquest of Al-Mansur).

Lupitus was  instrumental in the transfer of Arabic mathematics, including the astrolabe and the Hindu–Arabic numeral system to Christian Europe. Gerbert of Aurillac in a letter of 984 asks Lupitus for a translation of an Arabic astronomical treatise, the Sententiae astrolabii.

See also
 Barcelona's astrolabe

References
 Juan Vernet, The pursuit of learning - Moorish rule in Spain - Al-Andalus: where three worlds met, UNESCO Courier,  Dec 1991.  

Medieval Catalan astronomers
Medieval Spanish astronomers
10th-century astronomers
10th-century mathematicians
10th-century Catalan people